Storybook architecture is a style popularized in the 1920s in England and the United States. Houses built in this style may be referred to as storybook houses.

Description 

The storybook style is a nod toward Hollywood design technically called Provincial Revivalism and more commonly called Fairy Tale or Hansel and Gretel. While there is no specific definition of what makes a house storybook style, the main factor may be a sense of playfulness and whimsy. Most seemed snapped out of a craggy old-world village with intentionally uneven roofs, many cobblestone, doors and windows which may look mismatched and odd-shaped. It took a foothold in California, particularly in Los Angeles, during the 1920s and 1930s.

A primary example can be found in the 1927 Montclair, Oakland, firehouse, and in a more traditional English cottage-style in the 1930 Montclair branch library. Idora Park in north Oakland, California, is a four-square-block storybook architecture development begun in 1927 on the grounds of the old amusement park. Other examples in Los Angeles are the Snow White Cottages, designed in 1931 by architect Ben Sherwood; Charlie Chaplin Studios, built in 1919 by architects Meyer & Holler; the Charlie Chaplin Cottages, built in 1923 by Arthur and Nina Zwebell, a husband-and-wife architectural team; and the "Hobbit House" built between 1940 and 1970 by Disney artist Lawrence Joseph.

Architects and examples 

The primary architects that worked in this style are Harry Oliver, Ben Sherwood, William R. Yelland, Walter W. Dixon, Hugh W. Comstock, and Carr Jones among many other local architects.

Los Angeles area 

Oliver is noted for his Spadena House in Beverly Hills, and the Tam O'Shanter Inn in Atwater Village, Los Angeles. Harry Oliver worked on more than 30 Hollywood films as an art director or set decorator between 1919–1938. The Spadena House, also known as the Witch's House was originally built to function as offices and dressing rooms for Willat Studios, a silent film studio in Culver City. It was moved to Beverly Hills in either 1926 or 1934 (accounts vary) and has served as a private residence since that time. The Tam O'Shanter Inn, also a Storybook building, was designed by Oliver and built in 1922. Harry Oliver was also responsible for Van de Kamp bakery's trademark windmill buildings which were designed during the same time period.

Sherwood is noted for the Snow White Cottages built in 1931 in Los Angeles. 

Another example are cupola-topped storybook homes in a lot in Culver City constructed between 1946 and 1970. They are collectively known as the Hobbit Houses.

San Francisco Bay area 

William Yelland is noted for his (Thornburg) Normandy Village and Tupper & Reed Music Store, both located in Berkeley. Yelland designed homes in Oakland, Piedmont, Berkeley, San Leandro, Hayward, Woodland, Modesto, Clarksburg, Sacramento, Kensington and San Francisco.

W. W. Dixon is noted for his work with developer R. C. Hillen in creating the Dixon & Hillen catalog of home plans. Dixon is noted for Stonehenge & Stoneleigh villages in Alameda as well as Picardy Drive in Oakland.

Carr Jones is noted for the post office (now Postino Restaurant) in Lafayette. He also designed and built one-of-a-kind homes in Oakland, Berkeley and Piedmont such as the impressive Houvenin House at 85 Wildwood Gardens in Piedmont. He also built the Steve Jobs home in Palo Alto.

Hugh W. Comstock is noted for his "Fairy Tale," storybook architectural style, that has been closely identified with Carmel-by-the-Sea, California.

Gallery

See also 

Blaise Hamlet
Earl Young (architect)
Harold G. Stoner

References

Further reading

External links 

Oakland California Storybook House neighborhood
Storybook Style homeowners club maintained by John Robert Marlow
Thornburg (Normandy) Village, Berkeley, California by Daniella Thompson, Berkeley Architectural Heritage Association

House styles
American architectural styles
Novelty architecture